The Hans Schuler Studio and Residence is a historic home and artist studio located at Baltimore, Maryland, United States. It is an eclectic brick building constructed in two stages. The studio is one story high with a recessed skylight, and was designed by Baltimore architect Howard Sill and constructed in 1906; the residence is two stories tall plus a high, steep mansard story which was added in 1912. It combines elements from various fashionable styles and incorporating as ornament the work of sculptor Hans Schuler (1874-1951), for whom the building was constructed.  It currently houses The Schuler School of Fine Arts and The Schuler Gallery.

The Hans Schuler Studio and Residence was listed on the National Register of Historic Places in 1985.

References

External links
, including photo from 2004, at Maryland Historical Trust
The Schuler School of Fine Arts website

Art schools in Maryland
Education in Baltimore
Houses completed in 1906
Houses in Baltimore
Houses on the National Register of Historic Places in Baltimore
Midtown, Baltimore
Tourist attractions in Baltimore
1906 establishments in Maryland